The Mancunian double-decker bus is a type of bodywork for double-decker bus designed by Manchester Corporation Transport Department and built on Leyland Atlantean and Daimler Fleetline chassis. A total of 472 Mancunians were ordered by the department between 1965 and 1968 and delivered from 1968 until 1972 by Park Royal, East Lancs, Metro Cammell and Charles H Roe. A further 20 were built for Salford City Transport but were delivered new to SELNEC PTE.

Nine have been preserved.

References

External links

Double-decker buses
East Lancashire Coachbuilders
Bus transport in Greater Manchester
Vehicles introduced in 1968
History of Manchester